The turquoise darter (Etheostoma inscriptum) is a species of ray-finned fish, a darter from the subfamily Etheostomatinae, part of the family Percidae which includes the perches, ruffes and pike-perches. It is found in the Edisto, Savannah and Altamaha River drainages of North Carolina, South Carolina and Georgia. It inhabits rocky riffles of creeks and small to medium rivers.

References

Freshwater fish of the United States
Etheostoma
Fish described in 1878